C à vous is a TV show hosted by Anne-Elisabeth Lemoine that has been broadcast on the channel France 5 since 7 September 2009, from Monday to Friday at 7 p.m... The name is a pun on the French expression "" (in English, roughly, "The floor is yours"). The show is shot in an informal format in a Parisian loft.  Lemoine and her columnists discuss current affairs with guest(s) of the day around a table, while a chef (occasionally a famous chef) prepares a dish for them to enjoy.

History
The TV show  was created in September 2009 and was presented by Alessandra Sublet until June 2013.

A new segment called  (C à vous Continued), the next part of the show, has been broadcast since August 2010. This segment lasts around 12 minutes and introduces a dessert guest, who joins the dinner guest(s). It usually ends with a live song. From August 2010 to May 2013, it was broadcast at 8.25 p.m. Since June 2013, it has been broadcast at 8 p.m. after the main show, following a short advertising break.

Since September 2010 a selection of the best moments chosen from that week's shows has been broadcast every Saturday. It is called,  (The best of C à vous). The scheduling of this Saturday show has changed several times. It was broadcast at 12.30 p.m. from September 2010 then at 5.55 p.m. from September 2011, at 7 p.m. from September 2013, then back at 12.30 p.m. and finally at 1 p.m. in 2014.

 celebrated its 500th show in February 2012. For this occasion the guests of honor were Bruce Toussaint and Jean-Pierre Pernaut, two ex-bosses of Alessandra Sublet, who by that time was the presenter of the show. This special show was watched by 1.1 million viewers and produced 5.1% viewer share.

Anne-Sophie Lapix  hosted the show from 2013 to 2017.

References

2009 French television series debuts
2000s French television series
2010s French television series